Dichomeris leucothicta is a moth in the family Gelechiidae. It was described by Edward Meyrick in 1919. It is found in southern India.

The forewings are rosy brown with the costal edge ochreous yellow, at the base blackish. The stigmata are small, blackish and edged posteriorly (and at the second discal also anteriorly) with white, the plical beneath the first discal. The hindwings are grey.

References

Moths described in 1919
leucothicta